Brian Todd (15 December 1921 – 21 October 1992), known professionally as Bob Todd, was an English comedy actor, mostly known for appearing as a straight man in the sketch shows of Benny Hill and Spike Milligan. For many years, he lived in Tunbridge Wells, Kent.

Life and career
Todd was born in Faversham, Kent. One of the stooges of television comedy, Todd was best known for his lugubrious expression and talent for slapstick, and was known to fellow comedians by the nickname 'Silly Todd'.

Before working in television, Todd trained to be a dentist. The outbreak of the Second World War saw him enlist in the Royal Air Force, where he became a navigator stationed at RAF North Killingholme, Lincolnshire. He had ambitions of becoming a farmer—making money from cattle breeding, whilst working as a manager at London Airport. The farming business, once begun, failed and almost made him bankrupt. Meeting scriptwriters Ray Galton and Alan Simpson in a pub, he bluffed them into believing that he was in fact an actor and ended up with the part of a policeman in the Sid James comedy series Citizen James. He appeared as several characters in Milligan and John Antrobus' stage play The Bed-Sitting Room, which opened at the Mermaid Theatre on 31 January 1963.

He consequently stooged in The Dick Emery Show and The Mike and Bernie Winters Show amongst others, before joining The Benny Hill Show in 1968. He stayed with the programme, on and off, until Thames Television ended the show twenty-one years later. Todd was a regular on the 1971 The Marty Feldman Comedy Machine, appearing in 13 of the 14 episodes. In 1973, he appeared as Bill Thompson, the referee at a regimental boxing tournament in Adolf Hitler: My Part in His Downfall.

Todd gained a reputation for drunkenness while working on The Benny Hill Show. He once failed to turn up for a London Palladium show after a drinking episode, and found himself in a Dublin hospital five days later. After this was reported in the media, Hill had Todd dropped from the show. Producer Dennis Kirkland persuaded Hill to rescind the decision, saying Todd brought much to the show and his drinking rarely affected his work.

Todd's only starring role was as Dan the lavatory attendant in his own 1972 series In for a Penny, although he did appear in the Jimmy Jewel series Funny Man. He appeared in Eric Sykes's television series, in the episode "Sykes and A Bath", broadcast on 25 January 1961, in series three of Sykes and A..., in which he played a sad-faced man with one hand stuck inside a vase. He appeared in Sykes' film Rhubarb Rhubarb in 1980, as well as making guest appearances on shows by Jim Davidson and Allan Stewart and Spike Milligan's Q9. He was seen in cinema films, including Carry On Again Doctor, The Return of the Musketeers, and Mutiny on the Buses. He appeared in the 1980s series of The Sooty Show playing the part of The Black Hand, in the adventure film The Case of the Black Hand. He appeared in Gabrielle and the Doodleman as Merlin as well as an Ugly Sister with Windsor Davies in 1984.

Personal life
Todd and his wife, Monica, had one daughter and two sons. He died at the age of 70 in Sussex.

Selected filmography

 Raising the Wind (1961) – Street Musician – Accordionist (uncredited)
 Postman's Knock (1962) – District Superintendent
 The Intelligence Men (1965) – Policeman (uncredited)
 Hot Millions (1968) – British Commissionaire (uncredited)
 Carry On Again Doctor (1969) – Patient on Breathing Apparatus (uncredited)
 Scars of Dracula (1970) – Burgomaster
 She'll Follow You Anywhere (1971) – Car salesman
 Burke & Hare (1972) – Guard Campbell
 Mutiny on the Buses (1972) – New Inspector
 That's Your Funeral (1972) – Arthur (Funeral Director)
 Go for a Take (1972) – Security Man
 Adolf Hitler – My Part in His Downfall (1973) – Bill Thompson, Referee
 Digby, the Biggest Dog in the World (1973) – The Great Manzini
 The Flying Sorcerer (1973) – Crabtree
 The Over-Amorous Artist (1974) – Postman
 The Best of Benny Hill (1974) - Various roles
 The Four Musketeers (1974) – Firing Squad Officer
 Confessions of a Pop Performer (1975) – Mr. Barnwell
 The Ups and Downs of a Handyman (1976) – Squire Bullsworthy
 Come Play with Me (1977) – Vicar
 Rosie Dixon - Night Nurse (1978) – Mr. Buchanan
 Le Pétomane (1979, Short) – Joseph's Father
 The Sooty Show (1980, 8 Episodes: "The Case of The Black Hand") – The Black Hand
 Funny Man (1981, TV series) – Billy Strothers
 Superman III (1983) – Dignified Gent
 The Steam Video Company (1984, TV Series) – Calliban Spong / Loretta Del Rio
 Gabrielle and the Doodleman (1984) – Merlin / Ugly Sister
 The Return of the Musketeers (1989) – High Bailiff (final film role)

References

External links

Benny's Place tribute to Bob Todd

1921 births
1992 deaths
English male comedians
English male television actors
People from Faversham
Male actors from Kent
20th-century English male actors
20th-century English comedians
Royal Air Force personnel of World War II